Helen Phillips may refer to:

 Helen Phillips (soprano) (1919–2005), American dramatic lyric soprano
 Helen Phillips (artist) (1913–1995), American sculptor, printmaker, and graphic artist
 Helen Phillips (novelist) (born 1981), American novelist
 Helen Plummer Phillips (1850–1929) Australian educator, missionary and philanthropist